Ein Rogel (Hebrew:  ʿĒn Rōgēl), also known as Well of Job, is a spring on the outskirts of Jerusalem.

Ein Rogel was mentioned in the Hebrew Bible as the hiding-place of David's spies, Jonathan and Ahimaaz, during Absalom's uprising against the rule of King David. It may also have been a sacred place in pre-Israelite times.

Name

Ein Rogel

The application of the Biblical name Ein Rogel to the well in Silwan is long standing amongst early European travellers to Jerusalem.

In English it also appears as Enrogel (King James Version), En-rogel (2 Samuel 17:17, American Standard Version and English Standard Version), or En Rogel (NIV and NKJV). It is derived from Hebrew words meaning "eye of a traveller;" springs were seen as an "eye" in the landscape.

En Rogel was one of the boundary marks between Judah and Benjamin. During Absalom's uprising against David, Jonathan and Ahimaaz stayed at Ein Rogel, "for they dared not be seen coming into the city (Jerusalem); so a female servant would come and tell them, and they would go and tell King David". However, "a lad saw them, and told Absalom", and so they had to flee to Bahurim. Ein Rogel lay close to a stone, Zoheleth, where Adonijah, Solomon's half-brother of, held a sacrificial feast when he attempted to assert his claims to the throne.

As of 1901, the meaning of the name was uncertain. The interpretation 'Fuller's Well' does not bear the mark of antiquity. It is probable that, like Zoheleth, the original name had some sacred or mythic significance.

Ein Rogel is mentioned in "Topography of Jerusalem", a document found in the Cairo Geniza, which describes how the water breaks through to the riverbed after a winter of plentiful rainfall.

Bir Ayoub
Some scholars identify Ein Rogel with Bir Ayyub. The application of the name Bir Ayyub ( Bir Ayoub, also spelled Ayub, Ayoub) to the site is old, which translates to "Fountain of Job" or "Job's Well", as it was used by the local inhabitants of Jerusalem in early modern times. The name was used in Mujir al-Din's 1495 work "The glorious history of Jerusalem and Hebron" as if it was already long-standing. The name, "Job's well," is said to have been given to the site on account of an Arab legend which claimed that when the prophet Job was sick and eaten of worms, he went and bathed in a hole full of water, which stood where the well now stands, and that, at length, Job recovered his health and his body turned youthful, while the pool turned into a plenteous spring.

Well of Nehemiah or Well of Fire
It is also known as the Well of Nehemiah, or Puteus ignis (well of fire), in reference to the location in which the sacred fire was hidden during the Jewish captivity in 2 Macc. i. 19-22.

Description

Robinson, during his tour of Palestine in 1838, describes Bir Ayoub (Job's Well) as being "a very deep well, of an irregular quadrilateral form, walled up with large squared stones, terminating above in an arch on one said, and apparently of great antiquity. There is a small rude building over it, furnished with one or two large troughs."

A water plant was established near Bir Ayoub, which involved large expenses and a lot of labor. A canal was hewn in the rock, 2 meters high and 0.5 to 1 meter wide. The conduit is more than 600 meters long and passes under the western side of the stream channel at a depth of 23 to 30 meters below the surface. The place can be reached by a staircase that is interrupted in some places. It appears that the purpose of this conduit was to store the water flowing between the layers of limestone.
It is located just south of the junction of the three valleys - Wadi er-Rababi, Central and Kidron. Today there is a  modern pumping station there, drawing water from a 38 m deep well, whose stone lining may be partially of Roman date. Today the Bir Ayoub Mosque of Silwan stands above the Bir Ayoub well.

Gustaf Dalman who visited Palestine in the early 20th-century mentions a custom of the local inhabitants of Silwan to visit Bir Ayoub (Well of Job) and to recite a blessing for the coming rain.

Dispute
As of 1901, the identification of the well with Biblical Ein Rogel was uncertain, Charles Warren being one of its skeptics. Bir-Ayoub is a well, not a spring (although it may have formerly been a spring), and is said to lie too far from ez-Zehweleh, although it lies near a large stone in Siloam village called Zehwillat.

The Virgin's fountain (ʻAin Sitti Maryam), later ʻAin Umm ed-Deraj, has also been suggested for Ein Rigel as 'the only real spring close to Jerusalem', exactly opposite to which lies ez-Zehweleh, perhaps Zoheleth. The chief points in favour of this are its antiquity and the evidence of Josephus, who places the well in the royal gardens. Other arguments are based upon the fact that in later times the well was used by fullers.

Gallery

External links
Sacred Springs and Sabils

References

 

Hebrew Bible places
Springs (hydrology)
Siloam